Monument is the seventh studio album by English instrumental band Portico Quartet. It was released on 5 November 2021 by Gondwana Records.

Release
On 1 September 2021, Portico Quartet announced they were releasing their album Monument, alongside the lead single "Impressions".

Critical reception
Monument was met with "generally favorable" reviews from critics. At Metacritic, which assigns a weighted average rating out of 100 to reviews from mainstream publications, this release received an average score of 75 based on 6 reviews.

Track listing

Personnel 

Portico Quartet
 Duncan Bellamy
 Jack Wyllie

Additional musicians
 Francesca Ter-Berg – cello on tracks 1, 7 and 10
 Simmy Singh – violin on track 10

Production
 Mixed by Greg Freeman and Portico Quartet in Berlin, 2020
 Mastered by John Davis at Metropolis
 Design by Veil Projects

Charts

References 

2021 albums
Portico Quartet albums